Taricco is a surname. Notable people with the surname include:

Mauricio Taricco (born 1973), Argentine footballer
Sebastiano Taricco (1645–1710), Italian painter